Agăș is a commune in Bacău County, Western Moldavia, Romania. It is composed of eight villages: Agăș, Beleghet, Coșnea, Cotumba, Diaconești, Goioasa, Preluci and Sulța.

References

Communes in Bacău County
Localities in Western Moldavia